The Ven.  Harry William Carpenter , OBE,  MA was an  Anglican priest: the Archdeacon of Sarum from 1914 until 1936.
Born in 1854, he was educated at Peterhouse, Cambridge and  ordained in 1879. He was Vicar choral of Salisbury Cathedral from 1879 until   his appointment as an archdeacon.
He died on 20 July 1936.

References

1854 births
Alumni of Peterhouse, Cambridge
Officers of the Order of the British Empire
Archdeacons of Sarum
1936 deaths